Montroi is a municipality in the comarca of Ribera Alta in the Valencian Community, Spain.

Cultural event

 FIVAMEL: “The Valencian Honey Fair” organized by the city council and with the collaboration of industrialist of this area is held in mid November. During the two days, you can visit the Honey stands and bee products. Thousands of consumers, including elderly people and school children (who are offered a full breakfast with honey in the Fair) enjoy the Fair where big efforts to promote honey and encourage its consumption are taken. Round tables and contests complete the schedule of the Fair.

References

Municipalities in the Province of Valencia
Ribera Alta (comarca)